Ho Klong is a subdistrict in the Phrom Phiram District of Phitsanulok Province, Thailand. In 2016 it had a population of 4,751 people.

Geography
Ho Klong lies in the Nan Basin, which is part of the Chao Phraya watershed.

Administration

Central administration
The tambon is divided into seven administrative villages (mubans) (villages).

Local administration
The subdistrict is covered by the subdistrict administrative organization (SAO) Ho Klong (องค์การบริหารส่วนตำบลหอกลอง).

References

Extertnal links
Thaitambon.com on Ho Klong 

Tambon of Phitsanulok province
Populated places in Phitsanulok province